Indiana Jones and the Temple of Doom is a 1984 action-adventure film featuring the character Indiana Jones.

Indiana Jones and the Temple of Doom may also refer to:

Indiana Jones and the Temple of Doom (soundtrack), the film's soundtrack
Indiana Jones and the Temple of Doom (1985 video game), an arcade game based on the film
Indiana Jones and the Temple of Doom (1988 video game), a video game based on the film for the Nintendo Entertainment System

See also
Indiana Jones (disambiguation)